Kodikara is a Sinhalese surname. Notable people with the surname include:

Sirilal Kodikara (born 1924), Sinhalese novelist, poet, journalist, and radio play writer 
Thusara Kodikara (born 1969), Malaysian international cricketer

See also
Kodakara

Sinhalese surnames